Colonia Villa de Guadalupe (also known as La Villa de Guadalupe Hidalgo) is a former separate town, now a neighborhood in northern Mexico City which in 1531 was the site of the apparition of Our Lady of Guadalupe, the most renowned Marian apparition in the Americas. She is venerated in the Our Lady of Guadalupe Shrine, located in the villa (town).

The word Guadalupe comes from Spain, where it was originally the name of a river.

La Villa de Guadalupe is located in Mexico City (formerly called the Mexican Federal District) within the borough of Gustavo A. Madero. The town was founded in 1563 and chartered as the city of "Villa de Guadalupe Hidalgo" in 1828. The city was named after Miguel Hidalgo y Costilla, the initiator of the Mexican War of Independence.

The Treaty of Guadalupe Hidalgo which ended the Mexican–American War was signed here in 1848.

See also
 1848 in Mexico

References
 La villa de Guadalupe Hidalgo: Su historia, su estadística y sus antigüedades, Juan de la Torre, pub. 1887

External links
 Tourism guide to La Villa de Guadalupe, Mexico City government website

 

Gustavo A. Madero, Mexico City
Neighborhoods in Mexico City
History of Mexico City
Colonial Mexico
Populated places established in 1563
1563 in New Spain
1848 in Mexico
1563 establishments in New Spain
Our Lady of Guadalupe